The men's field hockey tournament at the 2013 Australian Youth Olympic Festival was the third edition of the field hockey tournament for men at the AYOF.

Australia won the tournament for the third time by defeating Great Britain 5–4 in the final. The United States won the bronze medal by defeating Malaysia 3–2 in a penalty shoot-out following a 4–4 draw.

Teams

Results

Pool matches

Classification matches

Third and fourth place

Final

Statistics

Final standings

References

External links

Men's tournament
2013 in Australian field hockey
Australian Youth Olympic Festival - Men's tournament